Tank Hill Park is located in San Francisco near the intersection of Clayton Street and Twin Peaks Boulevard, which circumscribes the hill to the south and east. A rocky outcropping defines the north side, which falls in cliffs to houses below.

From the south, and higher side of the hill, along Twin Peaks Boulevard, steps and a path lead to the top of the hill, which offers wonderful views of downtown San Francisco and the Golden Gate.

The top of the hill offers flat and paved areas that date back to civic waterworks that once existed on the top of the hill.

Tank Hill is a popular area for local residents to gather to watch municipal fireworks on the 4th of July. Crissy Field, to the north, is the usual site of a large San Francisco fireworks display, but the hills also offers views of fireworks in Oakland and the East Bay.

See also
 List of parks in San Francisco
 List of San Francisco, California Hills

References

External links
 
 
 
 

Parks in San Francisco
Hills of San Francisco
1977 establishments in California